Qianxi may refer to two counties of the People's Republic of China:

Qianxi, Guizhou (黔西市)
Qianxi County, Hebei (迁西县)